Sarah Wanless  is an animal ecologist in the UK and is an expert on seabirds; she is a Fellow of the Royal Society of Edinburgh and is Honorary Professor at the Universities of Glasgow and Aberdeen.

Education and career

Wanless was born in Scarborough, England and moved to Aberdeen, Scotland in 1969 for her undergraduate degree and then her PhD, which focused on northern gannets over three seasons on the island of Ailsa Craig in the Firth of Clyde.

She worked at the Institute of Terrestrial Ecology, the Nature Conservancy Council and the British Antarctic Survey before joining the Centre for Ecology & Hydrology (CEH) permanently in 1996 as a Higher Scientific Officer.  She rose to Individual Merit Scientist and retired in 2016 but is still involved with research as Emeritus Fellow at CEH.

Research 
In the 1980s, Wanless began one of the first radio-tracking studies into seabirds in the Northern Hemisphere, which helped to identify the foraging areas and the dangers that seabirds face due to climate change, pollution, fishing and off-shore wind farms; much of this research was conducted on the Isle of May in the Firth of Forth in Scotland.  She was the first female visiting scientist to the British Antarctic Survey's research station on Bird Island in South Georgia, where she studied the diving behaviour of South Georgia shags for two southern summers.  Wanless also studied gannets on Bempton Cliffs in Yorkshire and researched the foraging of puffins outside of the breeding season.

Over her career, Wanless published 250 papers, her bird tracking data was contributed to the Global Seabird Tracking Database.

Honours and awards 
Wanless was appointed Member of the Order of the British Empire (MBE) in the 2023 New Year Honours for services to seabird ecology.

 Elected a Fellow of the Royal Society of Edinburgh in 2006
 Awarded the Marsh Award for Conservation Biology by the Zoological Society London and the Marsh Christian Trust in 2007
 Gave the British Trust for Ornithology's Witherby Memorial Lecture in 2012
 Awarded the Godman-Salvin Medal by the British Ornithological Union in 2015
 Named one of the Outstanding Women of Scotland in 2018 by the Saltire Society
 Awarded the Peter Scott Memorial Award by the British Naturalists' Association in 2019
 Received an honorary Professorship in the Division of Environmental and Evolutionary Biology at the University of Glasgow and an honorary Professorship in the Department of Zoology at the University of Aberdeen
 Given lifetime achievement awards from the UK Seabird Group and the Pacific Seabird Group

Bibliography
Wanless wrote The Puffin with Mike P. Harris, published in 2012 by Bloomsbury  a revised version of the original 1984 Poyser monograph.

References

Living people
Year of birth missing (living people)
Women ornithologists
English ornithologists
Alumni of the University of Aberdeen
Fellows of the Royal Society of Edinburgh
People from Scarborough, North Yorkshire
Women ecologists
21st-century British scientists
20th-century British scientists
Members of the Order of the British Empire